Aqbal (also romanised as Āqbāl or Iqbāl and Eqbāl) is a village in Keshavarz Rural District, Keshavarz District, Shahin Dezh County, West Azerbaijan Province, Iran. At the 2006 census, its population was 713, in 157 families.

References 

Populated places in Shahin Dezh County